Stasys Darginavicius (28 June 1928 – 5 August 2004) was an Australian basketball player. He competed in the men's tournament at the 1956 Summer Olympics.

References

1928 births
2004 deaths
Australian men's basketball players
Olympic basketball players of Australia
Basketball players at the 1956 Summer Olympics
People from Palanga
Australian people of Lithuanian descent